Red Sundown is a 1956 American Western film directed by Jack Arnold and starring Rory Calhoun, Martha Hyer and Dean Jagger.

Plot
Alec Longmire (Rory Calhoun), a gunfighter, decides to change his ways after nearly losing his life. He reforms, becoming a deputy to an honest sheriff, Jade Murphy (Dean Jagger), and falling in love with the sheriff's daughter Caroline (Martha Hyer).

Cast
 Rory Calhoun as Longmire
 Martha Hyer as Caroline
 Dean Jagger as Jade Murphy
 Robert Middleton as Rufus Henshaw
 Grant Williams as Chet Swann
 Lita Baron as Maria
 James Millican as Bud Purvis
 Trevor Bardette as Sam Baldwin
 Leo Gordon as Rod Zellman
 David Kasday as Hughie Clore

References

External links
 
 
 
 

1956 films
Films based on American novels
Films based on Western (genre) novels
1956 Western (genre) films
American Western (genre) films
Films directed by Jack Arnold
Films scored by Hans J. Salter
Universal Pictures films
1950s English-language films
1950s American films